Maria Muldaur is the 1973 debut studio album of musician Maria Muldaur. The album includes "Midnight at the Oasis", her best-known single, which charted at #6 on the Billboard Hot 100 and "Three Dollar Bill", which charted at #7 on the Billboard Adult Contemporary charts. The album, which peaked at #3 on the Billboard 200, was certified gold by the RIAA on May 13, 1974.

The album was positively reviewed, and very positively in at least one case.  Writing in October 1973, Rolling Stone's reviewer Jon Landau described the album as "one of the half-dozen best" of the year, "the kind of glorious breakthrough that reminds me why I fell in love with rock & roll." The album is heavily influenced by country and blues.

Track listing 

Side One
 "Any Old Time" (Jimmie Rodgers) – 3:45
 "Midnight at the Oasis" (David Nichtern) – 3:49
 "My Tennessee Mountain Home" (Dolly Parton) – 3:32
 "I Never Did Sing You a Love Song" (Nichtern) – 2:49
 "The Work Song" (Kate McGarrigle) – 4:04

Side Two
 "Don't You Feel My Leg (Don't You Get Me High)" (Blue Lu Barker, Danny Barker, J. Mayo Williams) – 2:48
 "Walkin' One and Only" (Dan Hicks) – 2:47
 "Long Hard Climb" (Ron Davies) – 3:03
 "Three Dollar Bill" (Mac Rebennack) – 3:58
 "Vaudeville Man" (Wendy Waldman) – 2:41
 "Mad Mad Me" (Wendy Waldman) – 3:13

Charts

Personnel 
 Maria Muldaur - vocals
 Clarence White - acoustic guitar ("My Tennessee Home" and "The Work Song")
 Bill Keith - banjo ("Work Song" and "Vaudeville Man"), steel guitar ("Long Hard Climb" and "I Never Did Sing You a Love Song")
 Ry Cooder - acoustic guitar ("Any Old Time")
 David Lindley - Hawaiian guitar ("Any Old Time")
 Andrew Gold - acoustic guitar ("Vaudeville Man")
 David Nichtern - acoustic ("Long Hard Climb", "I Never Did Sing You a Love Song", "My Tennessee Home", "The Work Song", "Walkin' One and Only" and "Midnight at the Oasis" & electric guitar ("Long Hard Climb"), producer ("Mad Mad Me")
 David Grisman - mandolin ("My Tennessee Home")
 Dr. John - keyboards ("Vaudeville Man', "Don't You Feel My Leg" and "Three Dollar Bill"), horn arrangements ("Vaudeville Man", "Don't You Feel My Leg" and "Three Dollar Bill")
 Jim Dickinson - piano ("Any Old Time")
 Mark T. Jordan - piano ("The Work Song" and "Midnight at the Oasis")
 Spooner Oldham - piano ("Long Hard Climb" and "I Never Did Sing You a Love Song")
 Greg Prestopino - piano ("Mad Mad Me"), background vocals ("The Work Song" and "My Tennessee Home"), voices ("Midnight at the Oasis")
 James Gordon - organ ("Three Dollar Bill"), clarinet ("Vaudeville Man")
 Chris Ethridge - bass ("Long Hard Climb", "I Never Did Sing You a Love Song", "My Tennessee Home" and "The Work Song")
 Klaus Voormann - bass ("Vaudeville Man" and "Don't You Feel My Leg")
 Ray Brown - bass ("Walkin' One and Only")
 Dave Holland - bowed bass ("Mad Mad Me")
 Jimmy Calhoun - bass ("Three Dollar Bill")
 Tommy McClure - bass ("Any Old Time")
 Freebo - bass ("Midnight at the Oasis")
 Amos Garrett - bass, guitar, vocals, guitar solo ("Midnight at the Oasis")
 Jim Keltner - drums (all but 4 tracks)
 Ed Shaughnessy - drums ("Walkin' One and Only")
 John Boudreaux - drums ("Three Dollar Bill")
 Jim Gordon - drums ("Midnight at the Oasis")
 Chris Parker - drums ("Mad Mad Me")
 Jerry Jumonville - alto horn, horn arrangements ("Vaudeville Man", "Don't You Feel My Leg", "Three Dollar Bill")
 Artie Butler - alto horn, horn arrangements ("The Work Song")
 Nick DeCaro - accordion ("I Never Did Sing You a Love Song"), string arrangements ("Long Hard Climb", "I Never Did Sing You a Love Song" and "Midnight at the Oasis")
 Richard Greene - violin ("My Tennessee Home" and "Walkin' One and Only")
 Larry Packer - violin, viola ("Mad Mad Me")
 Karen Alexander - background vocals ("The Work Song")
 Gloria Jones - background vocals ("Three Dollar Bill")
 Ellen Kearney - background vocals ("My Tennessee Home", "The Work Song")
 Bettye LaVette - background vocals ("Three Dollar Bill")
 Jessica Smith - background vocals ("Three Dollar Bill")
 Beryl Marriott - violin

References 

1973 debut albums
Maria Muldaur albums
Albums produced by Joe Boyd
Albums produced by Lenny Waronker
Reprise Records albums